Opening Day Partners (ODP) is a company that owns and operates independent baseball teams in the United States. Since 1982, Opening Day Partners has owned and operated its own Minor League Baseball teams, operated teams for other organizations, assisted in the sale and purchase of teams, and advised and consulted with international clients.

The company has sought to standardize comfortable ballpark features such as hotel lobby-style box offices, more legroom for fans, padded seats, individual cupholders, 360-degree walkways, picnic areas able to accommodate large groups, and spacious playgrounds. The company was the first in minor league baseball to implement 20-horse carousels and bumper boat attractions able to accommodate children and adults. Currently, the only minor league ballparks in the world that have the bumper boat attraction are Clipper Magazine Stadium and Regency Furniture Stadium.

ODP has placed an emphasis on philanthropy through various fundraisers, charity events, specialty jersey auctions, and children's reading programs. It also incorporates local fans, ranging from the occasional to the hardcore, with fan fests, name-the-team contests, the incorporation of local companies and their products, and homages to each team's baseball and socio-geographic history.

History

Opening Day Partners, formerly  known as Keystone Baseball, has owned and/or operated several Major League Baseball-affiliated, professional baseball teams in the Maryland cities of Aberdeen, Bowie, Frederick, Hagerstown, and Salisbury. The company developed Atlantic League of Professional Baseball clubs in Camden, New Jersey, Lancaster, Pennsylvania, York, Pennsylvania, Waldorf, Maryland and Sugar Land, Texas before transitioning them to local interests.

Baseball & Sports Associates, LLC is an Opening Day Partners-owned company that handles baseball operations, including player development for numerous Minor League Baseball teams.

Relationship with Major League Baseball

Opening Day Partners has a long-standing relationship with Major League Baseball, and many of its individual clubs. The assignments undertaken by Opening Day Partners and its affiliates include:

 Providing the grounds crew for the 2000 Summer Olympics in Sydney, Australia, under contract to the Commissioner's Office
 Providing stadium refurbishment and grounds crew for the Baltimore Orioles historic exhibition game in Havana, Cuba
 Providing field design and installation advisory services to the Houston Astros
 Advising several Major League Clubs on their Minor League operations
 Operating the Maryland Fall League for minor league players

Stadium design and construction projects

Through its facility management division, Opening Day Partners has provided stadium design, construction, and operation services to numerous communities, in addition to providing such services on its own ballparks. Clients have included:

Food and beverage services

Through its food and beverage entities, Opening Day Partners has provided concession and catering services to minor league parks, arenas and universities nationwide including:

References

External links

 
American companies established in 1982
Camden Riversharks
Southern Maryland Blue Crabs
1982 establishments in Pennsylvania